Stroubles Creek is an approximately  stream that runs through the town of Blacksburg, the Virginia Tech campus, and Montgomery County, Virginia until it empties into the New River. Most of the sections of Stroubles Creek that flow through Blacksburg and the Virginia Tech campus are piped underground, while the portion that flows through Montgomery County is above-ground. Stroubles Creek has been designated an impaired waterway since 2002.

Physical characteristics

Stream 

Stroubles Creek flows into the New River, which then flows into the Kanawha River, the Ohio River, the Mississippi River, and finally the Gulf of Mexico. There are two branches that merge at the Virginia Tech Duck Pond: the Main Branch and the Webb Branch. Downstream of the Duck Pond, many tributary streams flow into Stroubles Creek, including Slate Branch and Walls Branch.

Watershed 
The Stroubles Creek watershed is further divided into an upper and a lower watershed, with the Virginia Tech Duck Pond acting as a divider between the two. The Lower Stroubles Creek watershed includes some urbanized areas on the western side of the Virginia Tech campus, but then it flows mostly through rural lands until it reaches the New River. The watershed is located in karst terrain, with limestone formations, sinkholes, and natural springs. The stream bed is made up of cobbles and pebbles with alluvia-floodplain deposits (stratified unconsolidated silt, clay, and sand with lenses).

History 
European settlers first moved into the Stroubles Creek area in the 1740s. It acted as a water source for the settlers, although today the New River is used as the water source for the area. In 1798, the town of Blacksburg was founded in the upper Stroubles Creek watershed. In 1851, the Preston and Olin Institute was opened, which would later become Virginia Tech. In 1937, Virginia Tech's Drillfield was constructed, which resulted in the main branch of Stroubles Creek being culverted underground. The Virginia Tech Duck Pond was also created at this time when a dam was constructed where the two branches merged.

Pollution incidents 
The Stroubles Creek watershed has experienced pollution going back to the 1800s. From the 19th century to the 1930s, coal mining wastewater contaminated the watershed. From 1970 to 1978, chemical waste from the Virginia Tech chemistry labs was discharged directly into the Duck Pond. In 1985, kerosene was spilled into the Duck Pond.

In the 1970s, the Clean Water Act prompted the Virginia Department of Environmental Quality (DEQ) to monitor the lower portion of the stream downstream of the Duck Pond. The DEQ classified lower Stroubles Creek as benthically impaired in 1996 and 1998. In 2002, Stroubles Creek was included as an impaired waterway in the Virginia total maximum daily load (TMDL) list of impaired waterways. The Virginia Tech Department of Biological Systems Engineering (BSE) conducted a study on the stream in 2003, and a TMDL implementation plan was completed in 2006 by the Center for TMDL and Watershed Studies through the BSE department.

See also
List of rivers of Virginia

References

External links 

Virginia Tech Site & Infrastructure Development
Virginia Department of Environmental Quality (DEQ)
Virginia Water Resources Research Center
Virginia Tech, Biological Systems Engineering Stream Research, Education, and Management (StREAM) Lab 
Center for TMDL and Watershed Studies, Virginia Tech
Virginia Tech LabView Enabled Watershed Assessment System (LEWAS) Lab
Montgomery County, Virginia
Blacksburg, Virginia

Virginia Tech
Rivers of Virginia
Rivers of Montgomery County, Virginia